The 1889 Mississippi gubernatorial election took place on November 1, 1889, in order to elect the Governor of Mississippi. This election was the last held under the Constitution of 1868. The 1890 constitution, adopted a year after the election, effectively disenfranchised African-Americans.

General election
In the general election, Democratic candidate John Marshall Stone, who previously served as governor from 1876 until 1882, ran unopposed.

Results

References

1889
gubernatorial
Mississippi
November 1889 events